Joren Dom (born 29 November 1989) is a Belgian footballer who plays for Oud-Heverlee Leuven in the Belgian First Division A as a right back.

External links

1989 births
Living people
Association football fullbacks
Belgian footballers
Belgian Pro League players
Challenger Pro League players
F.C.V. Dender E.H. players
Royal Antwerp F.C. players
K Beerschot VA players
Oud-Heverlee Leuven players